Frogtown is the name of several unincorporated communities in the U.S. state of Virginia.

Frogtown, Clarke County, Virginia
Frogtown, Fauquier County, Virginia, Fauquier County, Virginia